Kyrian Jacquet (born 11 May 2001) is a French professional tennis player.

Jacquet reached his career-high Association of Tennis Professionals (ATP) singles ranking of world No. 300 in October 2021 and doubles ranking of world No. 239 in August 2022.

At the 2020 Rennes Challenger, Jacquet was awarded a wild card.  He reached the quarter-finals where he lost in 3 sets to Britain’s James Ward.
In 2021, Jacquet reached two semi-finals at the Challengers of Aix-en-Provence 125 (France) and Tampere 80 (Finland)

Jacquet made his ATP Tour main draw debut in doubles when he was awarded a wildcard entry into the doubles draw at the 2020 French Open  alongside compatriot Corentin Denolly. They faced the first seeded and eventual semi finalist Colombian pair Robert Farah and Juan-Sebastian Cabal and won the first set 6–3; they  ultimately lost the match 6–3, 2–6, 3–6.

Jacquet has reached 4 career singles finals, all being on the ITF Futures Circuit, and has a record of 1 win (Helsinki) and 3 losses.

ATP Challenger and ITF Futures finals

Singles: 5 (1–4)

References

External links

2001 births
Living people
French male tennis players
Tennis players from Lyon